The 2022 Durand Cup, also known as IndianOil Durand Cup due to sponsorship ties with Indian Oil Corporation, was the 131st edition of Durand Cup, the oldest football tournament in Asia, and also the first edition since it was recognised by the Asian Football Confederation. This year for the first time the tournament was played in more than one venue. The tournament is hosted by the Durand Football Tournament Society in co-operation with the Eastern Command of the Indian Armed Forces and the Government of West Bengal, supported by the governments Assam and Manipur. This was the first season of the tournament wherein every club in the top tier Indian Super League has been mandated to participate, along with 5 selected clubs from the I-League, and the four teams representing the armed forces. 

Goa was the defending champion, having defeated Mohammedan in the 2021 final, but this time they couldn't progress beyond the group stage. The final was an all-ISL affair for the first time, and Bengaluru won their first-ever Durand Cup by defeating the debutants – Mumbai City by 2–1.

Teams

A total of 20 teams participated in the Indian football season opener: 11 clubs from the top division Indian Super League, 5 clubs from I-League and the traditional 4 teams representing the Indian Armed Forces.

Several top I-League clubs, most notably previous season's champions Gokulam Kerala, withdrew from the tournament. Gokulam cited improper scheduling, therefore chose to solely focus on league games, as they got replaced by Sudeva Delhi.

Venues
A total of 47 matches were played across 3 cities: Kolkata, Guwahati and Imphal, with 27 matches played in Kolkata, including the knock-out fixtures, and 10 matches each played in Guwahati and Imphal.

Prize money

Marketing

Official sponsors and partners

Co-sponsors 
 Coal India
 State Bank of India
 ITC
 Punjab National Bank
 GAIL

Supported by 
 Pramerica Life
 JIS Group
 Chemtex
 Siti Networks

Associate sponsors 
 Kalyani Group
 Dalmia Group
 Amul

Tournament partner 
 Cherry Tree

Broadcast and streaming partner 
 Sports18
 Voot

Source: Durand Cup on Twitter

Trophy tour 
The Durand Football Tournament Society (DFTS) organised a 15-day trophy tour prior to the beginning of the tournament. The tour was flagged off at the Eastern Command headquarters at Fort William in Kolkata on 19 July in the presence of the DFTS Chairman and Chief of Staff (Eastern Command) – Lt. Gen. KK Repswal, the Minister of Sports and Youth Affairs (Government of West Bengal) – Aroop Biswas and General Officer Commanding-in-Chief (Eastern Command) – Lt. Gen. RP Kalita. The Durand Cup, along with the President Cup and the Shimla Cup, visited Guwahati on 21 July, Imphal from 24–25 July, Jaipur from 27–28 July and a number of cities in Goa from 2–3 August before returning to Kolkata, where the tour was flagged in on 12 August at Gostha Pal Sarani, in front of the statue of legendary Indian footballer Gostha Pal. The destinations for the tour is selected particularly keeping in mind that Guwahati and Imphal are the first time hosts for the tournament, a Rajasthani team from Jaipur would be participating for the first time after forty years, and the defending champions hail from Goa.

Official song 
On 12 August, the DFTS released a theme song along with a music video to commemorate the age-old tournament entering a new era with the first time recognition from the AFC and participation of all ISL clubs. The song was titled "Durand...Durand" which was sung and performed by Papon, Shaan and Rewben Mashangva. The song was live performed on the opening matchdays at the three respective host venues by Papon and Mashangva.

Group stage

Group A

Group B

Group C

Group D

Knockout stage

Bracket

Quarter-finals

Matches

Semi-finals

Matches

Final

Statistics

Top scorers

Note: The team's score of the scorer is denoted first in the result row.

Most clean sheets

Discipline

Most yellow cards
 Team – (13) Mohammedan

Most red cards
 Player – (1 each)
  Hira Mondal
  Fallou Diagne
  Salam Johnson Singh
  Abhishek Halder
  Shubham Sarangi

 Team – (1 each)
 Bengaluru 
 Chennaiyin 
 TRAU
 Mohammedan
 Odisha

Season awards
 Golden glove: Antonio Dylan (Odisha)
 Golden boot: Lallianzuala Chhangte (Mumbai City)
 Golden ball: Greg Stewart (Mumbai City)

References

External links
 Durand Cup 2022: Fixtures, Scores, Results, Tables, & Top Scorers at Goal

2022 Durand Cup
Durand Cup seasons
2022 domestic association football cups
Durand Cup
Durand Cup
Durand Cup
Durand Cup